Frasier is an American sitcom created by David Angell, Peter Casey and David Lee and is a spinoff from the series Cheers, which was created by Glen Charles, Les Charles and James Burrows.

The series sees newly divorced psychiatrist Frasier Crane (Kelsey Grammer) leave behind his old life in Boston and relocate to his hometown of Seattle, Washington. He begins a new career as the host of his own radio call-in show, where he is assisted by his sassy, somewhat promiscuous producer, Roz Doyle (Peri Gilpin). Frasier quickly learns from his anal retentive younger brother Niles (David Hyde Pierce) that their disabled father Martin (John Mahoney) is no longer able to live alone, and Frasier reluctantly agrees to take him in, along with Martin's favorite recliner and his dog, Eddie (Moose). In order to help Martin with his physical therapy, he and Frasier ultimately hire a live-in housekeeper and therapist, Daphne Moon (Jane Leeves), a quirky British woman who believes she is psychic. The five quickly form a strange family unit, and Frasier comes to realize that even though his new life may not be what he planned, that does not mean that it is bad.

Frasier was broadcast on NBC for eleven seasons, from September 16, 1993 to May 13, 2004. It has been in syndication since 1997. Although the actual episode titles were rarely formally displayed on-screen, each episode had two or three 'title cards', flashed up on a black backdrop during an episode (usually at the start of one of the three parts of the original US broadcast). These pertained to the particular sequences of the episodes themselves, often in ways which were not immediately obvious. Many referred to classical literature and cultural subjects, while a small percentage were also the overall titles of the episodes.
264 episodes of Frasier were broadcast. Paramount Home Entertainment/CBS DVD has released all 11 seasons on Region 1, Region 2 and Region 4 DVD. In addition, the series was made available for streaming through services such as Hulu, Netflix,  and Amazon Video.

Series overview

Episodes

Season 1 (1993–94)

Season 2 (1994–95)

Season 3 (1995–96)

Season 4 (1996–97)

Season 5 (1997–98)

Season 6 (1998–99)

Season 7 (1999–2000)

Season 8 (2000–01)

Season 9 (2001–02)

Season 10 (2002–03)

Season 11 (2003–04)

Special (2004)

Ratings

Notes

References

External links 
 

Frasier